AJ's Fine Foods, formerly known as AJ Bayless, is a supermarket chain formerly headquartered in Phoenix, Arizona. It was founded by Arthur Joseph Bayless in the 1930s.

History 
The company went through a bankruptcy in the late 1980s. It was acquired by Bashas’ in 1993. Under Bashas' ownership, AJ's has positioned itself as an upscale gourmet and specialty grocery chain with each store located in affluent neighborhoods. The stores feature chef-prepared entrees, an extensive wine collection with trained cellar staff, and specialty baked goods.

Some locations in middle-class and blue-collar neighborhoods were converted to Bashas' Food City format.

References

External links

Companies based in Phoenix, Arizona